The Saint Michael Church is a Gothic style church in Košice, Slovakia. Originally a chapel, the building became officially a church after its reconstruction in 2006.

History
The Saint Michael Chapel was probably erected in the first half of the 14th century. It was built as a cemetery chapel inside the town walls in the place of the present-day park at Hlavná ulica (English: Main Street). The lower part of the chapel was initially an ossarium, the upper one served for offices for the deceased.

The chapel served as a Slovak church whereas the Cathedral of Saint Elisabeth was a German and Hungarian church.

During the rebuilding in the years 1902–1904, they pulled down the northern aisle (it was erected in 1508) and bricked 17 old gravestones (from the 14th century until the 17th century) into the exterior walls of the chapel to save them from destruction.

Bad condition of the building was the reason of the complex reconstruction in the years 1998–2006. The reconstructed chapel was consecrated on 22 January 2006 by Košice's archbishop, Alojz Tkáč. After the construction was finished, the chapel has officially become a church.

Interior
The patron of the dead, Saint Michael the Archangel, trampling the Devil, is shown on the facade. The archangels Raphael and Gabriel are on his sides. In the interior, there is a nice stone tabernacle, the ornamental sculpture Ecce Homo and rests of wall paintings from the Middle Ages. The first municipal coat of arms in Europe (dated back to 1369) is situated above the door leading to the vestry.

Gallery

See also
 Košice

References

Churches in Košice
Roman Catholic chapels in Slovakia
14th-century Roman Catholic church buildings in Slovakia
Gothic architecture in Slovakia